13 Fanboy is a 2021 American meta-slasher film directed by Deborah Voorhees and written and produced by her and Joel Paul Reisig. The film focuses on numerous actors that starred in a popular slasher film franchise who find themselves as the target of an obsessed fan that wants to replicate their death scenes in real life. It stars Hayley Greenbauer as Kelsie Voorhees, with Dee Wallace, Deborah Voorhees, C.J. Graham, Kane Hodder, Corey Feldman, Lar Park Lincoln, Judie Aronson, and Tracie Savage as fictionalized versions of themselves.

The film was conceived during the notable Friday the 13th lawsuit that prevented further films to be made. Although featuring an ensemble cast of Friday the 13th actors, it is wholly disparate in terms of tone and style and has no connections to the mythology of the Jason Voorhees saga.

The film was released in theaters and VOD on October 22, 2021.

Synopsis
After witnessing the murder of her grandmother Deborah Voorhees, a famous Friday the 13th actress, Kelsie Voorhees is left traumatized as a child. When other Friday the 13th actresses begin to fall victim to the killer, an adult Kelsie finds herself as the target of the deranged fan that wants to replicate the horror franchise's death scenes in real life after risking her life to save her grandmother's best friend Dee Wallace.

Cast
 Dee Wallace as herself
 Hayley Greenbauer as Kelsie Voorhees
 Poppy Gillett as the young Kelsie Voorhees
 Deborah Voorhees as herself: Deborah had a supporting role as Tina in Friday the 13th: A New Beginning (1985).
 C.J. Graham as himself: Graham portrayed Jason Voorhees in Friday the 13th Part VI: Jason Lives (1986).
 Kane Hodder as himself: Hodder portrayed numerous incarnations of the murderous Jason Voorhees in the Friday the 13th franchise.
 Judie Aronson as herself: Aroson portrayed Samantha in Friday the 13th: The Final Chapter (1984).
 Drew Leighty as Chris: Leighty portrayed Kyle McCleod in Never Hike Alone: A Friday the 13th Fan Film (2017).
 Lar Park Lincoln as herself: Lincoln portrayed Tina Shepard in Friday the 13th Part VII: The New Blood (1988).
 Tracie Savage as herself: Savage portrayed Debbie in Friday the 13th Part III (1982).
 Ron Sloan as himself: Sloan portrayed Junior in Friday the 13th: A New Beginning (1985).
 Corey Feldman as Mike Merryman: Feldman portrayed the younger version of recurring hero Tommy Jarvis.
 Jennifer Banko as herself: Banko portrayed Young Tina in ''Friday the 13th Part VII: The New Blood"" (1988).

References

External links
 

2021 films
2020s serial killer films
2020s slasher films
2020s teen horror films
American horror thriller films
American serial killer films
American slasher films
American teen horror films
Films set in 2007
Films set in 2020
Films about families
Self-reflexive films
Friday the 13th (franchise)
2020s English-language films
2020s American films